Dubai Golf City is a mixed-use $1.8 billion project covering . This unique golf community was developed by Benaa Development (part of Dubai-based Thani Investments) and offered a stunning collection of 700 mansions built around five golf courses. The project was intended for completion in Dubai, United Arab Emirates in late 2009, but has been on hold with only one golf course partly completed. This golf course is no longer being maintained and the project looks to have been abandoned (Feb 2023).

The development, when completed, will feature 5 world class golf courses, a golf academy, a grand 5-star resort with traditional architecture, retail souks, residential villages and convention centres. It is one of the most significant projects at Dubailand.

"The architecture provides a fusion of Arabic, Islamic and Moorish design elements resulting in a unique development that harmonises with the culture and history of the region. Also, the architectural character of the overall project is very unique and rich," said Abdulla Saeed Al Thani.

Attractions
Five themed golf courses
Golf Academy
Hotel, Convention Centre
'6-star' resort and spa
Themed golf villages
Mansion and villas

Construction Status
The master plan of the area has since changed to accommodate the DAMAC Lagoons project as well as the Paradise Hills Project.

See also
Dubai Sports City

References
Official website
Official press release

Golf clubs and courses in the United Arab Emirates
Proposed buildings and structures in Dubai
Dubailand
Proposed populated places